This is a list of people from Six Nations of the Grand River First Nation.

Politicians
Joseph Brant
Deskaheh
Roberta Jamieson
John Smoke Johnson
George Henry Martin Johnson

Actors
Gary Farmer
Graham Greene
Jay Silverheels
Cheri Maracle
Kiley May
Kevin Allan Hess

Musicians
Derek Miller
Robbie Robertson
A Tribe Called Red
Logan Staats
Tru Rez Crew
Jimi James
Dwayne Laforme
Murry Porter

Civil servants
Roberta Jamieson
Gilbert Monture
Julia Jamieson
Oliver Milton Martin

Athletes

Beverly "Bev" Beaver
Cory Bomberry
Clay Hill
Cody Jamieson
Stan Jonathan
Tom Longboat
Henry Maracle
Brandon Montour 
Ken Montour
Bobby-Man Brant Panag
Craig Point
Delby Powless
Gaylord Powless
Johnny Powless
Ross Powless
Sid Smith
Carey-Leigh Vyse (Thomas)
Karl "The Razor" Hess

Writers
Alicia Elliott
Pauline Johnson
Daniel David Moses
Barbara-Helen Hill

Scholars
Oronhyatekha
Albert Anthony
Cody Groat

Scientists
Arnold Anderson

Activists 

 Emily General

Other
Nikonha - last full blooded Tutelo speaker, died 1871 aged 106
Miss Indian World 2010 - Dakota Brant
Miss Indian World 2002 - Tia Smith
Rich Francis, TV personality and culinary chef

References

Six Nations
Six Nations people
Six Nations
Six Nations